VT58 may refer to:
 Vermont Route 58, a highway in the United States
 Torpedo Squadron Fifty Eight (VT-58), a United States Navy aircraft squadron